Qarah Chanaq or Qareh Chenaq may refer to:
 Qarah Chanaq, Ardabil
 Qareh Chenaq, East Azerbaijan